Zoogloea caeni is a gram-negative, catalase and oxidase-positiv, facultatively aerobic, nitrogen-fixing, rod-shaped motile bacterium with a polar flagellum from the genus of Zoogloea which was isolated from activated sludge of a domestic wastewater treatment plant in Korea.

References

External links
Type strain of Zoogloea caeni at BacDive -  the Bacterial Diversity Metadatabase

Rhodocyclaceae
Bacteria described in 2009